The Distinguished Scholarship Award is given by the Pacific Sociological Association (PSA) to sociologists based in the Pacific region of North America, in recognition of major scholarly contributions. To be eligible for the award, a sociologist's contribution must be embodied in a recently published book or through a series of articles with a common theme.

Recipients 
The Distinguished Scholarship Award was created by the PSA in 1984. The award was given biennially until 1990, when it became an annually granted award.
2015 - Paul Almeida, University of California, Merced: Mobilizing Democracy: Globalization and Citizen Protest
2014 - Isaac William Martin, University of California, San Diego: Rich People’s Movements: Grassroots Campaigns to Untax the One Percent
2013 - Drew Halfmann, University of California, Davis: Doctors and Demonstrators: How Political Institutions Shape Abortion Law in the United States, Britain, and Canada
2012 - Cecilia Menjívar, Arizona State University: Enduring Violence: Latino Women's Lives in Guatemala
2011 - Julie Shayne, University of Washington Bothell and University of Washington Seattle: They Used to Call Us Witches: Chilean Exiles, Culture, and Feminism
2010 - Kimberly Richman, University of San Francisco: Courting Change: Queer Parents, Judges, and the Transformation of American Family Law
2009 - Edward Telles and Vilma Ortiz, University of California Los Angeles: Generations of Exclusion: Mexican Americans, Assimilation, and Race
2008 - Ivan Light, University of California Los Angeles: Deflecting Immigration: Networks, Markets and regulation in Los Angeles
2007 - Jerome Karabel, University of California Berkeley: The Chosen: The Hidden History of Admission and Exclusion at Harvard, Yale, and Princeton
2006 - John Foran, University of California Santa Barbara: Taking Power: On the Origins of Third World Revolutions and Paul Lichterman, University of Southern California: Elusive Togetherness: Church Groups Trying to Bridge America’s Divisions
2005 - No award given
2004 - Evelyn Nakano Glenn, University of California Berkeley: Unequal Freedom: How Race and Gender Shaped American Citizens and Laura Grindstaff, University of California Davis: The Money Shot: Trash, Class, and the Making of TV Talk Shows
2003 - Amy Binder, University of California, San Diego: Contentious Curricula: Afrocentrism and Creationism in American Public Schools
2002 - Pierrett Hondagneu-Sotelo, University of Southern California: Domestica: Immigrant Workers Cleaning and Caring in the Shadows of Affluence
2001 - Valerie Jeness, University of California Irvine for a series of published articles dealing with hate-crimes, hate-crime legislation, and community responses to hate-motivated violence. The series was published in the following journals between 1994-1998: Gender and Society, Social Problems, Sociological Perspectives, Research in Social Movements, Conflict and Change, and the American Sociological Review.
2000 - Charles Varano: Forced Choices: Class, Community, and Worker Ownership
1999 - William Domhoff: Who Rules America? Power and Politics in the Year 2000
1998 - Simonetta Falasca-Zamponi: Fascist Spectacle: The Aesthetics of Power in Mussolini's Italy
1997 - Calvin Morrill: The Executive Way : Conflict Management in Corporations
1996 - James Aho: This Thing of Darkness: The Sociology of the Enemy
1995 - John Foran: Fragile Resistance
1994 - David A. Snow and Leon Anderson, Down on Their Luck: A Study of Homeless Street People
1993 - Rodney Stark and William Sims Bainbridge: A Theory of Religion
1992 - Kathy Charmaz: "Good Days, Bad Days, The Self in Chronic Illness and Time"
1991 - George M. Thomas: "Revivalism and Cultural Change: Christianity, Nation Building, and the Market in 19th-Century United States"
1990 - Jack Katz: Seductions of Crime: Moral and Sensual Attraction to Doing Evil
1988 - Unknown or No award given 
1986 - Claude S. Fischer: To Dwell Among Friends: Personal Networks in Town and City
1984 - No award given

See also

 List of social sciences awards

References 
 

Sociology awards
Social sciences awards